The First King: Birth of an Empire, released as Romulus v Remus: The First King in the UK, is a 2019 Italian historical drama film directed by Matteo Rovere.

Set in the 8th century BC, it is about the shepherd brothers Romulus and Remus and the founding of Rome. All dialogue is spoken in an early form of Latin. The movie had a budget of 7.5 million euros.

The film was theatrically released in Italy on 31 January 2019 by 01 Distribution.

Plot 
In Old Latium in 753 BC, a flash flood causes the two shepherd brothers Romulus and Remus to be stranded and captured as slaves in Alba Longa. They are able to rebel and free the other Latin and Sabine prisoners and take the Vesta priestess Satnei, who carries with her the sacred fire, as hostage. In a conflict concerning the injured Romulus, Remus ends up killing the Latin leader and becomes the new leader of the tribe.

The group face and defeat a warrior clan and Remus is appointed king by the surviving old men and women of their . During a sacrifice, Satnei predicts that one of the two brothers will become a great king and build an empire larger than what can be imagined, but to do so he will have to kill the other brother. The tribe assume that the prophecy means that Romulus will end up dead for the sake of his brother's greatness.

Remus refuses to accept a divine order that requires him to kill his brother. He extinguishes the sacred fire of Vesta, kills an old priest and leaves Satnei helpless in the middle of a forest. Romulus regains his health and confronts Remus about his actions. Remus, regretful, goes to find Satnei, who while dying from having been attacked by wild animals tells him that sparing Romulus now means that it is Remus who will end up dead at the hands of Romulus.

He appoints a young woman to watch over the fire so it remains lit, thereby establishing the first Vestal. Remus, trying to escape the prophecy, heads for the Tiber with a group of men, but is attacked by Alban cavalry and only saved by the tribe of Romulus. Remus then claims the tribe for himself, and threatening to extinguish the sacred flame is confronted by his brother. Remus induces his brother to kill him so that the prophecy can be fulfilled. On his deathbed he makes peace with his brother, recognizes him as his king, and tells him to establish a city on the other side of the river.

The tribe cross the Tiber and burn Remus' body on a pyre. Romulus swears to build the world's largest and most powerful city on his brother's ashes. He gives the city the name of Rome.

During the end credits, an animated map shows the expansion of the territory subject to Rome up to its peak under the emperor Trajan in 117.

Themes 
The film portrays a struggle between power and pietas, as represented by the two brothers. Ultimately, power is shown to become order only when submitted to the will of the gods. The director had no intention to comment on contemporary politics, but said that the myth's theme of love and hubris "talks to us through symbols that we can interpret in the light of our current time".

Cast 

 Alessandro Borghi: Remus 
 : Romulus 
 Fabrizio Rongione: Lars
 : Tefarie
 Tania Garribba: Satnei
 Lorenzo Gleijeses: Purtnass
 : Elaxantre
 Max Malatesta: Veltur
 Fiorenzo Mattu: Mamercus
 : Adieis
 Antonio Orlando: Erennis
 Vincenzo Pirrotta: Cai
 : Aranth
 Ludovico Succio: Marce
 Martinus Tocchi: Lubces
 Marina Occhionero: Acca Larentia
 Nina Fotaras: Ramtha
 Emilio De Marchi: Testa di Lupo
 Luca Elmi: Maccus

Production 
The idea to make the film in archaic Latin came from a desire to make the characters sound ancestral, which would help the audience to attune themselves to the story. The language was created by a team from the University Guglielmo Marconi led by professor Luca Alfieri, with the aid of Francesco Pirozzi and Beatrice Grieco. The team studied archaic Latin and "fleshed it out" with help from the reconstructed Proto-Indo-European language.

Two visual influences were the films Valhalla Rising (2009) and Apocalypto (2006).

Distribution 
Originally set for a release at the end of 2018, the film was distributed in Italian cinemas by 01 Distribution beginning on 31 January 2019. The film had grossed 2.1 million euros after the first three weeks of screening.

It was released in North America on DVD and Blu-ray Disc by Well Go USA Entertainment on 24 September 2019, with both original audio and an English-dubbed version, while in the United Kingdom by Signature Entertainment on 13 January 2020.

See also 
Duel of the Titans
Romulus (TV series), Rovere's 2020-2022 TV series spoken in Old Latin.
List of films based on Greco-Roman mythology

References

External links

2019 films
Films set in ancient Rome
2010s historical drama films
Italian epic films
Films shot in Lazio
Italian historical drama films
Films based on classical mythology
Films directed by Matteo Rovere
Films about royalty
Films set in the 8th century BC
Films about brothers
Cultural depictions of Romulus and Remus
Latin-language films